Kfar Shmaryahu  is a local council in Israel, within the Tel Aviv District.

History

Kfar Shmaryahu was founded in May 1937, during the Fifth Aliyah. The founding members were German-Jewish immigrants, who named the village after Shmaryahu Levin (1867–1935), a Russian-born Jewish Zionist leader. The village was founded as an agricultural community, with forty farms, thirty auxiliary farms, and twenty lots for housing projects. A well was drilled, and a synagogue that became the center of community life was also built. In late 1938, 60 families were living there, and the predominant language was German. Throughout the following years the town absorbed new immigrants. In 1950 it was declared a local council and was granted additional land.

Status

Kfar Shmaryahu is an affluent suburb of Tel Aviv. It is ranked very highly on the Israeli socio-economic scale (10 out of 10). According to Yedioth Ahronoth, Kfar Shmaryahu's municipality annually spends NIS 8,700 per resident, a figure higher than Tel Aviv and over twice as high as Jerusalem.

Notable residents

 Shai Agassi
 Shulamit Aloni (1928–2014), civil-rights politician and left-wing activist
 Aki Avni
Uri Davis, academic and civil rights activist
 Ilanit
 Sapir Koffmann, Miss Israel 1984
 Hillel Kook
 Daphni Leef, activist and video editor
 Ari Shavit, author, journalist
 Miriam Siderenski, Olympic runner
 Stef Wertheimer

References

External links

Official website of Kfar Shmaryahu 

Local councils in Tel Aviv District
German-Jewish culture in Israel